Badnagar Assembly constituency is one of the 230 assembly constituencies of Madhya Pradesh a central Indian state. Badnagar is also part of Ujjain Lok Sabha constituency.

Members of Legislative Assembly
 1977: Uday Singh Panday, Janata Party
 1980: Uday Singh Panday, Bharatiya Janata Party
 1985: Abhay Singh, Indian National Congress
 1990: Uday Singh Panday, Bharatiya Janata Party
 1993: Surender Singh Sisodiya, Indian National Congress
 1998: Virendra Singh Sisodiya, Indian National Congress
 2003: Shantilal Dhabai, Bharatiya Janata Party
 2008: Shantilal Dhabai, Bharatiya Janata Party
 2013: Mukesh Pandya, Bharatiya Janata Party

See also

 Ujjain
 Badnagar
 Ujjain (Lok Sabha constituency)

References

Assembly constituencies of Madhya Pradesh
Politics of Ujjain